KUST may stand for:

In geography:
 The Middle Persian name for “regions,” or “sides" of Iran.

In university:
Kohat University of Science and Technology in Kohat, Khyber Pakhtunkhwa, Pakistan
Komar University of Science and Technology in Sulaymaniyah, Iraq
Korea University of Science and Technology, in South Korea
Kunming University of Science and Technology in Kunming, Yunnan Province, China

In people:
 For the Belarusian painter, see Dmitry Kustanovich.

In broadcasting:
 KUST (FM), a radio station (88.7 FM) licensed to serve Moab, Utah, United States

In biology
Saussurea costus, also known as "kuth" or "costus", a species of thistle whose roots are a source of essential oils